Daud Memorial Medical Center is a well equipped medical center which is located at unit no.06 on thari road at Mehrabpur.

The main objective of the founder is to establish a not-for-profit medical center, which would provide health care services to patients from all income groups, especially to lower and middle social classes.

References

Naushahro Feroze District